Hoàng Cẩm Vân (born 31 May 1959) is a Vietnamese female singer. She appeared on Vietnam Idol (season 1), and was scheduled to be a judge on Cặp đôi hoàn hảo (season 1). She provided the song, "The Spring", to the Russian-Vietnamese film Coordinates of Death.

References

21st-century Vietnamese women singers
1959 births
Living people
20th-century Vietnamese women singers